Year of the Lash (in Spanish, Año del Cuero) is a term used in Cuba in reference to June 29, 1844, when a firing squad in Havana executed accused leaders of the Conspiración de La Escalera, an alleged slave revolt and movement to abolish slavery in Cuba.  The term "Year of the Lash" refers generally to the harsh response toward the would-be revolt by Cuban authorities, whereby thousands of Afro-Cubans (both slave and free) were executed, imprisoned, or banished from the island.  La Escalera (the ladder) alludes to the fact that slave suspects were bound to ladders and whipped with the lash when they were interrogated.

Historians have debated over the years whether the Conspiracy of La Escalera was real or whether it was largely an invention of the Spanish authorities to justify a crackdown on abolitionists and the Afro-Cuban population, though at this point there seems to be a consensus that some kind of revolt was planned. The British consul to Cuba, David Turnbull, was convicted in absentia of being the "prime mover" of the conspiracy.  Turnbull had already been expelled by Cuban authorities two years earlier.

See also

Timeline of Cuban history
History of Cuba
Spanish colonization of the Americas
David Turnbull (British abolitionist)
 Carlota (rebel leader)

References

Further reading
 Paquette's Sugar is Made With Blood is a standard account.  See his introduction, "La Escalera and the Historians," for an overview of the historiographical debate.

June 1844 events
Spanish colonial period of Cuba
Slavery in Cuba
1844 in North America